Banian is a town and sub-prefecture in the Faranah Prefecture in the Faranah Region of Guinea. As of 2014 it had a population of 36,445 people.

La sous-préfecture de Banian est située à 65 kilomètres du centre ville de Faranah et 72 kilomètres lui séparant de la ville de Kissidougou

Elle a une superficie de 2 650 km2 avec 47000 habitants en 2021.

Composée de 26 districts et de 85 secteurs.

References

Sub-prefectures of the Faranah Region